is a Japanese video game event director and scenario writer who works at Square Enix. He joined the predecessor company Square in 1995. In his role as event planner for Final Fantasy VII, Akiyama was responsible for the story elements and cutscenes involving the characters Red XIII and Yuffie Kisaragi, respectively. During his work as the event director of Vagrant Story, he intended to make the transitions between gameplay and event scenes as smooth as possible. The fully polygonal graphics of the game entailed precise camera movements, character animations and the usage of different lens effects.

In late 1999, Akiyama watched Disney's animated Tarzan film and then pleaded with Kingdom Hearts director and story writer Tetsuya Nomura to join the game's team. He became the event planning director and one of the scenario writers, taking charge of the Tarzan-themed segment, among others. Akiyama tried to inject Disney-like humor into the game, such as a scene in which Donald Duck is flattened by an opening door. He also suggested Final Fantasy VIII character Squall Leonhart be renamed Leon to maintain suspense before his first on-screen appearance. In January 2002, Akiyama joined the Final Fantasy XII project as event director in charge of such aspects as camera movements, voice-overs and motions. When Yasumi Matsuno stepped down as the game's director in mid-2005, he expressed his high confidence in the remaining team members, among them Akiyama. Many of the story ideas that Akiyama came up with alongside scenario writer Daisuke Watanabe had to be abandoned in order to finish the game on time. For a time, Akiyama was the event planning director of Final Fantasy Versus XIII (which was later reworked into Final Fantasy XV).

Works

References

Final Fantasy designers
Japanese video game designers
Living people
Video game writers
Square Enix people
1973 births